The Burbank International Film Festival (BIFF) is an annual film festival held since 2009 in Burbank, California, United States. It was founded by Val Tonione, and awards are distributed to filmmakers that have focused on social and environmental issues.

2009

It ran from March 22 to 29 at the Woodbury University.

2010
It ran from July 31 to August 7 at the Woodbury University. The winners were:

Best Feature Film: Charlie Valentine
Best Short Film: True Beauty, This Night
Best Documentary: Gus, An American Icon
Best Student Film: Jale
Best Film Noir: Sage
Best Animated Short: Skylight
Best Drama: Tick Tock (Tracey Birdsall)
Best Western: The Sierra
Best Music Video: "City of Noise"
Best Foreign Film: Andheri
Best Sci-Fi Comedy: Fudgy Wudgy Fudge Face and The Adventures of Zion Man & The Supreme Commander
Best Sci-Fi: Enigma 
Best Commercial: HBO's The Deal Breaker and Levi's' True Love Ad
Best Cinematography: Mansfield Path
Best Based on A True Story: Grace Bedell
Best Directing: Daniel Sametz for Buroinfierno
Best Socially Conscious Film: The Elephant in the Living Room and The Cartel
Shortest Short: Peel
Best Screenplay: Daniel D. Molinoff for Outrider
Best Historical Piece: A Letter from Home
Best Editing: James Coblentz for Mansfield Path
Best Acting: Peter Green for Poetry Man
President's Award: Poetry Man

2011
It ran from September 15 to 18 at the Burbank AMC Theatres. The winners were:

Best Feature (Narrative): A Lonely Place for Dying
Best Feature (Animation): Fullmetal Alchemist: The Sacred Star of Milos
Best Short Film (Narrative): Bathing and the Single Girl
Best Short Film (Animation): Friday Night Tights
Best Documentary: Canine Instinct
Best Indie Animation: Biology
Currator's Choice Award for Animation: The Fantastic Flying Books of Mr. Morris Lessmore
Best Foreign Film: Augenblicke
Best Student Film (Narrative): Dr. Thompson
Best Student Film (Animation): An Awkward Situation
Best Screenplay (Unproduced): The King's Son
Best Writing (Original): Amanda
Best Writing (Adaptation): Tell-Tale
Best Writing (Animation / Original): Supa Pirate Booty Hunt: Music Saves Lives PSA
Best Writing (Animation / Adaptation): Fullmetal Alchemist: The Sacred Star of Milos
Bella Fe Films / FrameFroge Previz (core version) development scholarship winner: Imprinted
FrameFroge Previz 3D Pro version software winner: To the End of the World
Best Commercial: Adidas' The Aerialist
Best Director (Narrative): Martin Barigel for Augenblicke
Best Director (Animation): Kazuya Murata for Fullmetal Alchemist: The Sacred Star of Milos
Best Actor in a Leading Role: Sam Gipson for The Insides of a Lamb
Best Actress in a Leading Role: Emma Karawady for Death Wish
Best Voice Acting: Spike Spencer for Supa Pirate Booty Hunt: Music Saves Lives PSA
Best Cinematography: Greg Williams for Tell-Tale
Best Film Editing: Nicholas Goodman for Help Me Please
Best Costume Design: Red Princess Blues
Best Visual Effects: Divination and Defective Detective  
Best Character Design: Supa Pirate Booty Hunt: Music Saves Lives PSA
Best Production Design: Supa Pirate Booty Hunt: Music Saves Lives PSA
Best Art Direction: Supa Pirate Booty Hunt: Music Saves Lives PSA
Best Sound Editing: Supa Pirate Booty Hunt: Music Saves Lives PSA
Best Music: Defective Detective
Best Science Fiction Film: The New World
Best Horror/Thriller Film: Blackstone
Best Comedy Film: Pepper
Best Drama Film: Freak
Best Music Video: "Stockpiling Poison"
Flappers Funny Film Contest: Runyon: Just Above Sunset
Sonic Sound-off: Best Band: Outliar
Feature Selection Award: Narrative Film: Wong Flew Over the Cuckoo's Nest
Feature Selection Award: Short Film: Ingrid Pitt: Beyond the Forest
Feature Selection Award: Animated Feature: Quantum Quest: A Cassini Space Oddesssey
Feature Selection Award: Documentary: Adventures in Plymptoons

2012
It ran from September 5 to 9 at the Burbank AMC Theatres. The winners were:

Best Feature Documentary: Greedy, Lying, Bastards
Best Short Documentary: Among Giants
Best Adapted Screenplay: The Legend of Mccoy Mountain
Best Original Screenplay: Jack and Annie's Co List
Best Music Video: "Space Tree"
Best Student Film: Impetuous
Best Animated Short Film: Devils, Angels and Dating and Beaver Creek episode 7
Best Foreign Feature Film: Ecstasy
Best Foreign Short Film: I Am Neda
Best Commercial: True Power
Best Comedy Short Film: Camp Chapel
Best Short Film by Women: When You Find Me and Neighbors
Best Horror Short Film: The Curse
Best Science Fiction Short Film: The Taste of Copper
Best Comedy Short Contest: High Maintenance
Comic Book / Graphic Novel Competition
Best Cover: Infex
Best Comic Book: M3
Best Graphic Novel: Trench Coats, Cigarettes and Shotguns
Best Thriller Feature Film: In The Eyes of a Killer
Best Thriller Short Film: Tracer Gun
Best Dramatic Feature Film: Things I Don't Understand
Best Dramatic Short Film: Masque
Best New Media: The Division
Best Actor: Adam Sinclair for Ecstasy
Best Actress: Danielle Harris for Shiver and Kelli Garner for Neighbors
President's Innovation Award: White Room: 02B3

2013
It ran from September 4 to 8 at the Downtown Burbank. The winners were:

Best Feature Documentary: Walk On
Best Short Documentary: Jujitsing Reality
Best Adapted Screenplay: Lifetime Loser
Best Original Screenplay: Hard Promises and Arc of Eloides”
Best Student Film: Boots and Hear Me RoarLos Angeles County Student Filmmakers Award: Being and IngrainedBest Animated Short: TailedBest International Animated Short: Wings of TimeBest Foreign Feature Film: Los TraficantesBest Comedy Feature Film: Chasing TasteBest Foreign Short: Sweet LoveBest Comedy Short Film: Driving TinseltownBest Film by Women: Ghost ExchangeBest Faith Based Short Film: StaticBest Horror Short Film: Through the WoodsBest Science Fiction Short Film: SupervisedBest Horror Feature Film: A House Is Not A HomeBest Thriller Feature Film: ChinkBest Dramatic Feature Film: A Fish StoryBest Thriller Short Film: Incident on Highway 73Best Dramatic Short Film: ImagineBest New Media: On Begley StreetBest New Media – Comedy: Heavenly HelpBest Actor: Scott Wolf for Imagine and Eddie McClintock for A Fish StoryBest Actress: Jayne Heitmeyer for A Fish Story and Elizabeth Schmidt for Incident on Highway 732014
It was held from September 3 to 7 at the Downtown Burbank. The winners were:

President's Innovation Award: The Moving Picture Co. 1914Best Dramatic Short: The Last SessionBest Feature Documentary: Better Things: The Choices of Jeffrey Catherine JonesBest Short Documentary: Pie Lady of Pie TownBest Student Film: Into The Silent SeaLos Angeles County Studen Filmmmakers Award: UnmatchedBest Animated Short: The NumberlysBest Foreign Short: Butterfly DreamsBest Comedy Short: Heal ThyselfBest Short by Women: SophieBest Horror Short: Playing with the DevilBest Science Fiction Short: Stranger at the PentagonBest Thriller Short: The MonstersBest New Media – Comedy: The Impression GuysBest New Media – Drama: Star Trek Continues: Fairest of Them AllBest Faith Based Film: Families Are ForeverBest Adapted Screenplay: The GuideBest Original Screenplay: The Seduction of Auntie RoseBest Actor: Daniel Baldwin for Wisdom To Know The DifferenceBest Actress: Teri Polo for The Last SessionBest Feature – Drama: Wisdom To Know The DifferenceBest Feature – Thriller : MercenariesBest Feature – Films by Women : The Piano: An OdysseyBest Feature – Foreign Film: Miss JulieBest Feature – Science Fiction: Time LapseBest Feature – Faith Based: The God Question''

References

External links

Culture of Burbank, California
Film festivals in California
Cinema of Southern California